James Bennett Kelly III (born May 28, 1941) serves as Executive in Residence at the University of Pittsburgh Katz Graduate School of Business. For three years he was president and CEO of Flight Explorer, a software and IT solutions provider to the global aviation community. A former pilot, Kelly took the company from a significant loss to profitability while doubling revenue and implementing an exit strategy resulting in the company's acquisition by Sabre Holdings. As the founder of SynXis, a hotel reservation management software provider to over 50,000 hotels, Mr. Kelly served for eight years as president and CEO. Sabre acquired SynXis in 2005. Kelly is a former Vice President, International, of BDM, an 8,000-person Carlyle technical services firm now part of Northrop Grumman. He previously served as International Programs Vice President at SAIC and before that was Deputy Assistant Secretary, Economic Policy, Africa the Near East and South Asia under Secretary Malcolm Baldrige in the second Reagan Administration. Prior to joining the Administration, he held various international engineering marketing positions, worked for several years on Capitol Hill and served six years in the Pennsylvania Legislature. Mr. Kelly is a graduate of Virginia Tech, where he served for ten years on the Pamplin Business School Advisory Board, and ASU's well-known Thunderbird School of Global Management.

Additional information

An experienced international executive, Mr. Kelly has directed the global growth of a variety of American firms in over fifteen countries. He lived in Europe, the Middle East, North Africa and Asia a total of ten years and speaks French and Italian. He spearheaded Dutch manufacturing consulting and German aerospace and defense acquisitions adding $200 million in revenue to BDM's global reach. BDM was taken public by Carlyle and later acquired by Northrop Grumman. Mr. Kelly established the European headquarters of a diversified American manufacturing firm while acquiring a Dutch subsidiary and consolidating Austrian, French, and Spanish affiliates. As SAIC's International Vice President he established a French medical systems affiliate with the former minister of health. As a Deputy Assistant Secretary of Commerce in the Reagan Administration, Mr. Kelly was responsible for economic relations with 72 countries in Africa, the Near East, and South Asia. He handled a number of sensitive negotiations with countries such as Iraq, South Africa, Saudi Arabia, Algeria, India, and Pakistan. A former member of the Pennsylvania House of Representatives and assistant to U.S. Senators Richard S. Schweiker (R-PA) and Hugh Scott (R-PA), he is well versed in government matters and operations.  Mr. Kelly was in 1977 one of the first American executives to foresee the opening of trade relations with China. He subsequently led the efforts of Dravo, a Pittsburgh engineering and river equipment manufacturing company, to improve transportation and communications the length of the Yangtze River spending the better part of two years in emerging China.

References

Living people
1941 births
Republican Party members of the Pennsylvania House of Representatives
Politicians from Pittsburgh
Virginia Tech alumni
University of Pittsburgh faculty
20th-century American politicians
United States Department of Commerce officials
Reagan administration personnel